Sant Julià de Ramis is a village in the province of Girona and autonomous community of Catalonia, Spain.

In 1972 the neighbouring municipality of Medinyà was annexed by Sant Julià de Ramis, but it regained its municipal independence in June 2015. At the end of January 2018 it reverted to its 1972–2015 status following a court judgement that it had insufficient population.

References

External links
 Government data pages 

Municipalities in Gironès